Yuri Alexandrovich Shaporin  ( – 9 December 1966), PAU, was a Russian-Ukrainian Soviet composer.

Biography
Shaporin was born in Hlukhiv in the Russian Empire (now in Ukraine). His father was a painter and his mother a pianist. He received his secondary education in Saint Petersburg. He first studied philology at Kiev University and went on to study law at Saint Petersburg University.

He then turned to music, starting his studies at the Saint Petersburg Conservatory in 1913. His teachers there included Nikolay Sokolov (composition), Maximilian Steinberg (orchestration), and Nikolai Tcherepnin (conducting). He graduated as a composer and conductor in 1918.

After the Bolshoi Drama Theater was established in 1919, he served as its musical director until 1928. He then worked with the Russian State Pushkin Academy Drama Theater — also known as the Alexandrinsky Theater — until 1934. During this period he composed a significant amount of theater music. He was a founding member of the Association for Contemporary Music in 1923.

During the 1930s Shaporin turned his attention to large scale works. His opera Dekabristi (The Decembrists), to a libretto written by Aleksey Nikolayevich Tolstoy about the Decembrist revolt, had been on Shaporin's mind since 1920 — a 1925 interim version, Polina Gyobe, had two scenes staged in Leningrad (as it had been renamed in 1924). In 1938, Shaporin received an offer of a teaching position at the Moscow Conservatory and he moved to Moscow. 
That year, he completed a version of Dekabristi for a commission by the Bolshoi Theatre, but dissatisfied with it, he decided to revise it. In 1952, Shaporin was awarded the Stalin Prize. The opera was only completed in 1953, after collaboration with librettist Vsevolod Rozhdestvensky, and it was premiered at the Bolshoi Theatre on 23 June 1953.

Among Shaporin's students at the Moscow Conservatory were Edward Artemiev and Rodion Konstantinovich Shchedrin.

Further reading
Grosheva, Elena Andreevna, ed. Iurii Aleksandrovich Shaporin : literaturnoe nasledie—statʹi, pisʹma : statʹi o tvorchestve I.U.A. Shaporina : vospominaniia sovremennikov. Moscow: "Sov. kompozitor", 1989. .
Martynov, I. (Ivan Ivanovich.) Iurii Shaporin. Moskva : Izd-vo Muzyka, 1966. OCLC 10286667. Work list: pp. 161–164.

Selected works
Piano sonatas (at least two. First sonata, opus 5 published around 1924. Sonata no. 2 is op. 7, published around 1929)
Symphony for chorus and orchestra, op. 11, completed 1932 and premiered in London by Albert Coates and the BBC Symphony Orchestra
Na pole Kulikovom (On the Field of Kulikovo): cantata, op. 14
The Story of the Struggle for the Russian Soil op. 17 (recorded on HMV in about 1970)
How long shall the kite fly? : oratorio for baritone, mezzo-soprano, chorus and orchestra, op. 20
5 Pieces for cello and piano, op. 25
Ballade for piano, op. 28
Dekabristy (The Decembrists), opera, completed 1953

Film music
The Deserter (1933)
Tri pesni o Lenine (Three Songs about Lenin) (1934)
Zaklyuchennye (Prisoners) (1936)
Victory (1938)
Minin and Pozharsky (1939)
Suvorov (1941)
Kutuzov (1944)

External links
 Biography

[ Biography] by Michael Jameson at Allmusic
Biography and works

1887 births
1966 deaths
People from Hlukhiv
Ukrainian classical composers
Russian male classical composers
Stalin Prize winners
Soviet film score composers
Male film score composers
Russian opera composers
Male opera composers
20th-century Russian male musicians